Peter Fleming and John McEnroe won in the final 6–3, 6–2 against Mansour Bahrami and Diego Pérez.

Seeds
Champion seeds are indicated in bold text while text in italics indicates the round in which those seeds were eliminated.

 Boris Becker /  Slobodan Živojinović (first round)
 Guy Forget /  Yannick Noah (semifinals)
 Peter Fleming /  John McEnroe (champions)
 Sergio Casal /  Emilio Sánchez (first round)

Draw

External links
 1986 Paris Open Doubles draw

Doubles